Waltham Common Lock (No 10) is a lock on the River Lee Navigation at Waltham Cross in Hertfordshire, England. The lock is located in the River Lee Country Park and stands close to the Broxbourne White Water Canoe Centre.  At the tail of the lock is the Powdermill Cut dug in 1806 to connect the Waltham Abbey Royal Gunpowder Mills directly to the then-new navigation.

Public access 
Car parking is available at Windmill Lane, Cheshunt. Pedestrian and cycle access is via the towpath that forms part of the Lea Valley Walk. The area is served by Cheshunt railway station.

References

External links 
 Waltham Common Lock – a history

Locks in Hertfordshire
Locks in Essex
Locks of the Lee Navigation
Waltham Cross